Me, Myself & I is an American television sitcom created by Dan Kopelman that aired on CBS. The series stars Bobby Moynihan, Jack Dylan Grazer, John Larroquette, Brian Unger, Jaleel White, Kelen Coleman, Mandell Maughan, Christopher Paul Richards, Reylynn Caster, and Skylar Gray.

The series premiered on September 25, 2017. It was pulled from CBS's lineup after the first six episodes ranked last in the ratings among the network's Monday-night sitcom lineup. It was the first network television cancellation of the 2017–18 television season. The show was not renewed for a second season, and the remaining episodes of the series were burned off during the summer of 2018, concluding on July 21, 2018.

Premise
The show follows the life of Alex Riley, an inventor, businessman and Chicago Bulls fan, at three points in his life: as a 14-year-old who moves with his mother to Los Angeles in 1991 to live with his new stepfather and stepbrother; as a 40-year-old dealing with the breakup of his marriage and being a single father in the present day, while trying to navigate his way out of "inventor's block"; and as a 65-year-old in 2042 who has just retired from his immensely successful company and reconnected with his childhood love.

Cast and characters
The regular and recurring cast includes:
Bobby Moynihan as Alex Riley (present): An inventor recalling three stages of his life. He lives with his best friend after a divorce from his wife, and soon learns his wife wants to move away with their daughter, Abby.
Jack Dylan Grazer as Alex Riley (past): A middle school student who spends much of his free time inventing. He must adjust after moving in with his new stepdad and stepbrother. He crushes on Nori, whom he meets at his new school. 
John Larroquette as Alex Riley (future): The billionaire owner of the major company Riley Industries, who is now retiring. He realizes his old crush Nori is his true love. 
Brian Unger as Ron (past and present): Alex's stepfather.
Jaleel White as Darryl (present): Alex's childhood friend and business partner who lets Alex live in his garage after Alex's divorce.
 Alkoya Brunson as Darryl (past)
Tim Reid as Darryl (future)
Kelen Coleman as Abby (future): Alex's daughter with Sarah. She is the general manager of the Chicago Bulls.
 Skylar Gray as Abby (present)
 Christopher Paul Richards as Justin (past): Alex's stepbrother.
 Ryan Hansen as Justin (present)
 Ed Begley Jr. as Justin (future): the Governor of California.
Mandell Maughan as Maggie (past and present): Alex's mother.
Reylynn Caster as Eleanor "Nori" Sterling (past): Young Alex's crush who deals with having rumors spread about her. She has a crush on Alex.
 Sharon Lawrence as Eleanor Sterling (future): The owner of a diner.
Ella Thomas as Jasmine (future): Future Alex's CFO and Darryl's daughter.
 Mandeiya Flory as Jasmine (present)
Justin Stella as Phil Ricozzi (past): Alex's childhood nemesis who dated Nori.
 Stephen Rannazzisi as Phil Ricozzi (present)

Production
On May 12, 2017, the show was ordered to series. The series premiered September 25, 2017, on CBS and was given a thirteen episode order. On November 1, 2017, CBS pulled the series from the schedule after six low-rated episodes, leaving seven episodes unaired, and announced that the series will remain in production for all thirteen episodes and would return to the schedule at a later date. On June 7, 2018 it was announced that the show would return to the schedule on July 7, 2018 and the remaining seven episodes would air over a three-week period. The final episode aired on July 21, 2018.

Episodes

Reception

Ratings

Critical response
The review aggregator website Rotten Tomatoes reported a 63% approval rating with an average rating of 6.12/10 based on 24 reviews. Metacritic, which uses a weighted average, assigned a score of 57 out of 100 based on 18 critics, indicating "mixed or average reviews".

References

External links
 

2010s American sitcoms
2017 American television series debuts
2018 American television series endings
English-language television shows
Television series by Warner Bros. Television Studios
CBS original programming
Nonlinear narrative television series
Television shows set in Los Angeles
Television series set in the 1990s
Television series set in 1991
Television series set in the 2040s
Television series by Kapital Entertainment